Félix Ynduráin Muñoz (born January 18, 1946) is a Spanish condensed matter physicist and Professor at the Autonomous University of Madrid. He has more than 120 research papers published. Some of the centers where he has worked are the University of Cambridge, the University of California, Berkeley, the Thomas J. Watson Research Center, the Massachusetts Institute of Technology, the University of Paris-Sud and the Max Planck Institute for Solid State Research.

His research is currently focused on properties of point and extended defects in graphene and its derivatives, electronic structure and electron-phonon interaction in iron-based superconductors of high critical temperature, and on clathrate hydrates as storage of methane, carbon dioxide, hydrogen, etc.

References

External links 
 Félix Ynduráin's research papers in Physical Review Letters
 Félix Ynduráin's research papers in arXiv
 Ideas4all

Spanish physicists
1946 births
Living people
Academic staff of the Autonomous University of Madrid